El Shams is an Egyptian football club based in Cairo, Egypt.
They are currently a member of Egyptian Third Division, the third flight of Egyptian football.

Despite its position in the Egyptian Third Division, El Shams club has one of the most successful Egyptian Youth academies, generating a big number of successful athletes and champions.

History

The club was founded in May 1962 as sports social club and was called the Heliopolis Sporting Club (El Shams), based in the northern section of Cairo Governorate.

El Shams football team participated only once in the Egyptian Premier League and that was in 1997–98. The team won 5, drew 9, and lost 16 matches earning the 16th place (last place). As a result, the team was relegated to the Egyptian Premier B.

References

External links
 El Shams Official Website 

Football clubs in Egypt
1962 establishments in Egypt
Association football clubs established in 1962
Sports clubs in Egypt